The Crown Debts Act 1609 (7 Jac 1 c 15) was an Act of the Parliament of England.

The words of commencement were repealed by section 1 of, and Schedule 1 to, the Statute Law Revision Act 1948.

The whole Act, so far as unrepealed, was repealed by section 1 of, and Part VII of the Schedule to, the Statute Law (Repeals) Act 1969.

References
Halsbury's Statutes,

Acts of the Parliament of England
1609 in law
1609 in English law